Awtar Singh or Awtar Singh Khalsa (1966 - 1 July 2018) was an Afghan politician. He was the Sikh representative to the Loya Jirga from Paktia Province. He was the only non-Muslim representative there. His native tongue was Punjabi. He was in charge of the main Sikh temple (Gurdwara) in Kabul.

Singh was a member of the Mesherano Jirga (upper house) for a term of five years, beginning in 2005.

He had planned to contest the minority seat in the 2018 parliamentary elections. Singh was killed on 1 July 2018 in a suicide bombing in Jalalabad which killed 18 other people, mostly from Afghanistan's Sikh and Hindu minority. ISIL claimed responsibility for the attack. Singh was 52 and is survived by his wife and 4 children, one of whom was injured in the blast. His son Narendra Singh Khalsa contested the minority seat and won.

References

External links
Afghan Hindus, Sikhs see hope The Tribune - June 9, 2002

1960s births
2018 deaths
Afghan politicians
Afghan Sikhs
Place of birth missing
Afghan people of Punjabi descent
Assassinated Afghan politicians
People from Paktia Province
Members of the House of Elders (Afghanistan)